Hesychius may refer to:

Hesychius of Cazorla (first century), Spanish Christian missionary, bishop, martyr and saint
Hesychius of Antioch (fourth century), Antioch saint 
Hesychius of Sinai (fourth century), Byzantine hieromonk and author
Hesychius of Alexandria (probably fifth century), Alexandrian lexicographer
Hesychius of Jerusalem (probably fifth century), Jerusalem Christian presbyter and exegete
Hesychius I (bishop of Vienne) (fifth century), French bishop and saint
Hesychius II (bishop of Vienne) (sixth century), French bishop and saint
Hesychius I (bishop of Grenoble) (sixth century), French bishop
Hesychius of Miletus (sixth century), Greek chronicler and biographer